A sea urchin is a spiny marine echinoderm.

Sea Urchin may also refer to:
The Sea Urchin (1913 film)
The Sea Urchin (1926 film)
The Sea Urchins, an English indie pop band
Sea Urchins, a 1980–84 New Zealand television series